Jürgen Theobaldy (born 7 March 1944) is a German writer who lives in Switzerland.

Early life and education 
Jürgen Theobaldy comes from a working-class family. and grew up in Mannheim as a child of a working class family. As a poet, he was representative of the current known as “New Subjectivity” in German post-war literature.  He was born in Strasbourg (occupied France) and grew up in Mannheim, Germany – a major industrial centre not far away from Strasbourg. During World War II, the city was heavily bombed, but it was rebuilt quickly after the war.

It was here that Theobaldy completed a commercial apprenticeship. Subsequently, he studied at the pedagogical universities of Freiburg (Breisgau) and Heidelberg, hoping perhaps, at least initially, to become a primary or secondary school teacher. He then studied literature at the universities in Heidelberg and Cologne and, since 1974, at the Free University in Berlin. He has lived in Switzerland since 1984.

Poetry 
His literary beginnings are to be found in the student movement of the late 1960s when he wrote "Die Freiheit für Bobby Seale", a widely-noticed poem about an anti-war demonstration. Gregory Divers emphasizes the style that reveals the author’s indebtedness to what was at the time fairly recent and often provocative American and recent US-influenced British poetry.

In the late 1960s or early 1970s, Theobaldy soon became interested in Beat poetry, and also in the poetry of Britain's "Angry Young Men" and women.In 1974, Rolf Dieter Brinkmann and Jürgen Theobaldy were both living in London in the house of the author John James and thanks to him, they got to know the poets Peter Riley and Andrew Crozier Theobaldy translated poems by Jim Burns, and was also interested in Latin American poets like Roque Dalton and Ernesto Cardenal. Theobaldy included translations of poems by both poets in 1973 in issue 4 of the poetry journal “Benzin” that he edited.

In the early 1970s, Theobaldy  belonged to a circle of poets that included Rolf Dieter Brinkmann, Ralf-Rainer Rygulla, Rolf Eckart John, and others. All of these poets lived in Cologne. They knew each other closely. It was Theobaldy who accompanied Brinkmann to London on that trip that ended Brinkmann's life due to a traffic accident. Theobaldy was  present when R.D. Brinkmann died in this traffic accident.

According to the Brinkmann Handbook, documents deposited by the poet Jürgen Theobaldy in “the Swiss Literature Archives in Bern” include “a dossier concerning Rolf Dieter Brinkmann.”

The early 1970s can be considered as the phase when Theobaldy began to focus on "anti-ideological" everyday reality in his poetry in a way that was similar to the approach of Nicolas Born, an aesthetically advanced, sensitive and simultaneously immensely political poet at the time. According to the Encyclopedia of Contemporary German Culture, a change occurred and increasingly, formerly politically outspoken “[p]oets such as Jürgen Theobaldy and Nicolas Born focused on everyday private experience.” This was also stated by the poet Micheal Buselmeier in 1977 when he described his turn from "political" to much more subjective poetry.  Buselmeier stated categorically, “It seems to me that the traditional avant-garde attitudes -  of taking either the political strategies or the literary styles for absolutes- are worn out. Instead, reflected positions, those of enduring given contradictions, have the chance to be understood today.”

As the Brinkmann Handbook notes, a poeticological and political difference of opinion existed between certain German Beat poets like Hübsch, Fauser and Ploog („Deutsche Beat-Autoren wie Hadayatullah Hübsch, Jürg Fauser und Jürgen Ploog“) and, on the other side, such poets as “Born or Theobaldy.”

It was in the mid- or late 1970s that Theobaldy became known as a key figure of the so-called "new subjectivity" current in late 20th-century German poetry. According to Gregory Divers, “Theobaldy is not only a representative poet of the New Subjectivity, he also served as its chief spokesperson.” Confronted with the views of leftwing literary critics, Theobaldy always rejected the notion that his own way of embracing a “new” subjectivity was not political.

Later on, Jürgen Theobaldy began to experiment with stricter, more traditional forms. It seems that a fairly recent volume of poems by Theobaldy entitled Wilde Nelken (Wild Carnations) returns to the free, subjective style and air of his poetry of the 1970s. The same is probably true of his new volume poems entitled Hin und wieder hin: Gedichte aus Japan.

In addition to poems, he has published several novels and volumes with stories, most of which are indebted to experiences gained in such different places as Heidelberg, Berlin, and Bern that were stations of his life.

A book by Michael Kämper-van den Boogart summarily treats Theobaldy’s novels and prose texts as well as those of his colleagues Botho Strauss and Uwe Timm by seeing “an aesthetics” that mirrors the experience of human failures and defeats accomplished in their socially critical works.

Works 

•	Sperrsitz. Gedichte, Palmenpresse, Köln 1973

•	Blaue Flecken. Gedichte, Rowohlt Taschenbuch Verlag, Reinbek bei Hamburg 1974

•	Veränderung der Lyrik, edition text + kritik, München 1976 (zusammen mit Gustav Zürcher)

•	Zweiter Klasse. Gedichte, Rotbuch Verlag, Berlin 1976

•	Sonntags Kino. Roman, Rotbuch Verlag, Berlin 1978

•	Drinks. Gedichte, Verlag Das Wunderhorn, Heidelberg 1979

•	Schwere Erde, Rauch. Gedichte, Rowohlt Taschenbuch Verlag, Reinbek bei Hamburg 1980

•	Spanische Wände. Roman, Rowohlt Verlag, Reinbek bei Hamburg 1981

•	Die Sommertour. Gedichte, Rowohlt Verlag, Reinbek bei Hamburg 1983

•	Midlands, Drinks. Gedichte, Verlag Das Wunderhorn, Heidelberg 1984

•	Das Festival im Hof. Erzählungen, Rotbuch Verlag, Berlin 1985

•	In den Aufwind. Gedichte, Friedenauer Presse, Berlin 1990

•	Der Nachtbildsammler. Gedichte, Palmenpresse, Köln 1992

•	Mehrstimmiges Grün. Prosa und Lyrik, Text und Porträt 14, hg. vom LCB, Aufbau Verlag, Berlin 1994

•	Jürgen Theobaldy & Thomas Weber. Erzählung, Berlin 1996 (zusammen mit Thomas Weber)

•	Immer wieder alles. Gedichte, zu Klampen Verlag, Lüneburg 2000, ISBN 978-3-933156-54-9.

•	In der Ferne zitternde Häuser. Prosa, Verlag Das Wunderhorn, Heidelberg 2000, ISBN 3-88423-170-7.

•	Trilogie der nächsten Ziele. Roman, zu Klampen Verlag, Springe 2003, ISBN 978-3-933156-77-8.

•	Wilde Nelken. Gedichte, zu Klampen Verlag, Springe 2005, ISBN 978-3-933156-84-6.

•	24 Stunden offen. Gedichte, Verlag Peter Engstler, Ostheim/Rhön 2006, ISBN 3-929375-75-3.

•	Suchen ist schwer. Gedichte, Verlag Peter Engstler, Ostheim/Rhön 2012, ISBN 978-3-941126-33-6.

•	Aus nächster Nähe. Roman, Verlag Das Wunderhorn, Heidelberg 2013, ISBN 978-3-88423-441-9.

•	Rückvergütung. Roman, Verlag Das Wunderhorn, Heidelberg 2015, ISBN 978-3-88423-491-4.

•	Hin und wieder hin. Gedichte aus Japan. Verlag Peter Engstler, Ostheim/Rhön 2015, ISBN 978-3-941126-66-4.

•	Auf dem unberührten Tisch. Gedichte, Verlag Peter Engstler, Ostheim/Rhön 2019, ISBN 978-3-946685-21-0.

•	Geschichten im Vorübergehen. Prosa, verlag die brotsuppe, Biel 2020, ISBN 978-3-03867-026-1.

Edited works

Benzin. (Mimeographed literary journal, ed. by Jürgen Theobaldy; published in Heidelberg), 1971–1973

Und ich bewege mich doch. Gedichte vor und nach 1968. München: Beck,1977.

Translations 

•	 Aras Ören: Der kurze Traum aus Kagithane, Rotbuch Verlag, Berlin 1974 (Adaptation of a translation by H. Achmed Schmiede)

•	Jim Burns: Leben in Preston, Palmenpresse, Köln 1973 (Jointly translated by Jürgen Theobaldy and Rolf Eckart John)

•	Jim Burns: Fred Engels bei Woolworth, Rotbuch Verlag, Berlin 1977 (Transl. with Rolf Eckart John)

•	Lu Xun: Kein Ort zum Schreiben. Gedichte, Rowohlt Taschenbuch Verlag, Reinbek bei Hamburg 1983 (Transl. from the Chinese with Egbert Baqué)

References 

Living people
1944 births
20th-century German writers
21st-century German writers
Writers from Strasbourg
German emigrants to Switzerland